Sumedang Regency is a landlocked regency (kabupaten) of West Java province, Indonesia. The district of North Sumedang is its capital. The regency covers an area of 1,558.72 km2, and had a population of 1,093,602 at the 2010 Census and 1,152,507 at the 2020 Census; the official estimate as at mid 2021 was 1,159,346.

The city of Sumedang is famous for its tofu, Tahu bungkeng, that was first produced by a Chinese immigrant from Qing China.

Administrative districts
Sumedang Regency is divided into twenty-six districts (kecamatan), listed below with their areas and populations at the 2010 Census and 2020 Census, together with the official estimates as at mid 2021. The table also includes the locations of the district administrative centres, the number of villages (rural desa and urban kelurahan) in each district, and its post code.

The first five districts named above - Jatinangor, Cimanggung, Tanjungsari, Sukasari and Pamulihan - are in the southwest corner of the regency adjacent to Bandung City and lie within the Bandung Metropolitan Area. They cover 224.53 km2 and had a combined population of 349,750 at the 2010 Census, and 365,622 at the 2020 Census; the official estimate as at mid 2021 was 368,000.

Jatigede Dam
In August 2011, the project of Jatigede Dam in Cimanuk River has been initialized. The dam capacity is almost one billion cubic metre will be the Indonesian second biggest dam in capacity after Jatiluhur Dam.

An agreement to make a hydro power plant with capacity of 2x25 megawatts and an estimated cost $224.4 million has been signed in December 2011. The production will be incorporated to the Java-Bali 150KiloVolt transmission system in 2015.

Waterfalls
In Citengah village area, South Sumedang district there are 18 waterfalls. Citengah agro tourism and waterfalls village can be reached from Sumedang Central Park to the east through Cipameungpeuk bridge. The unique waterfalls are Cigorobog waterfall with its 4 step waterfalls, 30 meters Cimecek waterfall and U-shape Ciparahu waterfall. The environment is well preserved with monkeys and wild pigs in the hill.

References